Aničić (Cyrillic script: Аничић) is a South Slavic surname. Notable people with the surname include:

Dragan Aničić (born 1970), Serbian football coach and former player
Marin Aničić (born 1989), Bosnian footballer
Michael Aničić (born 1974), German footballer

Serbian surnames
Croatian surnames